French conjugation refers to the variation in the endings of French verbs (inflections) depending on the person (I, you, we, etc), tense (present, future, etc) and mood (indicative, imperative and subjunctive). Most verbs are regular and can be entirely determined by their infinitive form (ex. parler) however irregular verbs require the knowledge of more than just the infinitive form known as the principal parts of which there are seven in French. With the knowledge of these seven principal parts of a verb one can conjugate almost all French verbs. However, a handful of verbs, including être, are highly irregular and the seven principal parts are not sufficient to conjugate the verb fully. 

French verbs are conventionally divided into three conjugations (conjugaisons) with the following grouping:
 1st group: verbs ending in -er (except aller, envoyer, and renvoyer).
 2nd group: verbs ending in -ir, with the gerund ending in -issant
 3rd group: verbs ending in -re (with the exception of irregular verbs).
 1st section: verbs ending in -ir, with the gerund ending in -ant
 2nd section: verbs ending in -oir.
 3rd section: verbs ending in -re
 aller, envoyer, and renvoyer.

The first two groups follow a regular conjugation, whereas the third group is more complex. The third group is considered a closed-class conjugation form, meaning that most new verbs introduced to the French language are of the first group (téléviser, atomiser, radiographier), with the remaining ones being of the second group (alunir).

The verbs aller, envoyer, and renvoyer are the only verbs ending in -er belonging to the third group.

Moods and tenses
There are seven different moods in French conjugation: indicative (indicatif), subjunctive (subjonctif), conditional (conditionnel), imperative (impératif), infinitive (infinitif), participle (participe), and gerund (gérondif). The infinitive, participle, and gerundive are not verbal moods.

Tenses are described under the mood to which they belong, and they are grouped as follows. Other tenses are constructed through the use of an auxiliary verb:

Indicative
Present (présent)
Present perfect  (passé composé): literally "compound past", formed with an auxiliary verb in the present
Imperfect (imparfait)
Pluperfect (plus-que-parfait): literally "more than perfect", formed with an auxiliary verb in the imperfect
Simple past (passé simple)
Past perfect (passé antérieur): formed with an auxiliary verb in the simple past
Simple future (futur simple)
Future perfect (futur antérieur): formed with an auxiliary verb in the simple future
Subjunctive
Present
Past (passé): formed with an auxiliary verb in the subjunctive present
Imperfect
Pluperfect: formed with an auxiliary verb in the subjunctive imperfect
Imperative
Present
Past: formed with an auxiliary verb in the present imperative
Conditional
Present
Past (form 1): formed with an auxiliary verb in the present conditional
Past (form 2): formed with an auxiliary verb in the imperfect subjunctive
Infinitive
Present
Past: formed with an auxiliary verb in the present infinitive
Participle
Present
Past
Gerund: (constructed by preceding the present participle with the preposition en)

Auxiliary verbs
There are two auxiliary verbs in French: avoir (to have) and être (to be), used to conjugate compound tenses according to these rules:

Transitive verbs (direct or indirect) in the active voice are conjugated with the verb avoir.
Intransitive verbs are conjugated with either avoir or être (see French verbs#Temporal auxiliary verbs).
Reflexive verbs (or "pronominal verbs") are conjugated with être.
être is used to form the passive voice. Être is itself conjugated according to the tense and mood, and this may require the use of avoir as an additional auxiliary verb, e.g. Il a été mangé (It was eaten).

Compound tenses are conjugated with an auxiliary followed by the past participle, ex: j'ai fait (I did), je suis tombé (I fell). When être is used, the participle is inflected according to the gender and number of the subject. The participle is inflected with the use of the verb avoir according to the direct object, but only if the direct object precedes the participle, ex:
 il a marché, elle a marché, nous avons marché (he walked, she walked, we walked)
 il est tombé, elle est tombée, nous sommes tombés, elles sont tombées (he fell, she fell, we fell, they (fem.) fell)
 Il a acheté une voiture. Voilà la voiture qu'il a achetée. (He bought a car. Here is the car he bought)

As stand-alone verbs, the conjugation of the two auxiliaries is listed in the table below:

Avoir
This verb has different stems for different tenses. These are imperfect av- ; present subjunctive ai- ; future and conditional aur- ; simple past and past subjunctive e- (not pronounced: eus, eusse are pronounced as bare inflections ). Although the stem changes, the inflections of these tenses are as a regular -oir verb.

In the present, not only are there stem changes, but the inflections are irregular as well:

* Notice that the imperative form uses the subjunctive conjugation.

Non-finite forms:
 Infinitive: avoir 
 Present participle: ayant 
 Gerundive: en ayant 
 Verbal adjective: ayant(s) , ayante(s) 
 Past participle: eu(e)(s) 

Auxiliary verb: avoir

Être
This verb has different stems for different tenses. These are all pronounced differently: imperfect ét- ;  present subjunctive soi- ; future and conditional ser- ; simple past and past subjunctive in f- . The inflections of these tenses are as a regular -oir verb (that is, as an -re verb but with the vowel u  in the f- forms). For example, subjunctive soyons, soyez is pronounced with the y sound of other -re and -oir verbs.

In the simple present, not only are there stem changes, but the inflections are irregular as well:

* The imperative form uses the subjunctive conjugation.

The non-finite forms use the stem êt-  (before a consonant)/ét-  (before a vowel):
 Infinitive: être
 Present participle: étant
 Gerundive: en étant
 Verbal adjective: étant(e)(s)
 Past participle: été

Auxiliary verb: avoir

First-group verbs (-er verbs)
French verbs ending in -er, which constitute the largest class, inflect somewhat differently from other verbs. Between the stem and the inflectional endings that are common across most verbs, there may be a vowel, which in the case of the -er verbs is a silent -e- (in the simple present singular), -é or -ai  (in the past participle and the je form of the simple past), and -a-  (in the rest of simple past singular and in the past subjunctive). In addition, the orthographic -t found in the -ir and -re verbs in the singular of the simple present and past is not found in this conjugation, so that the final consonants are -Ø, -s, -Ø rather than -s, -s, -t.

Parler

Non-finite forms:
 Infinitive: parler 
 Present participle: parlant 
 Gerundive: en parlant 
 Verbal adjective: parlant(s) , parlante(s) 
 Past participle: parlé(e)(s) 

Auxiliary verb: avoir
(arriver, entrer, monter, passer, rester, rentrer, retourner, and tomber use être)

Exceptional contexts:
 When the first-person singular present tense form of the indicative or subjunctive is found in inversion, the writer must change the final e to either é (traditional usage) or è (rectified modern usage), in order to link the two words : « Parlè-je ? », "Am I speaking?" (This is a very rare construction, however.)
 When the second-person singular form of the imperative is followed by its object y or en, a final s is added: « Parles-en ! », "Talk about it!"

Exceptional verbs:
 The verb aller, though it ends in -er is completely irregular and belongs to the third group.
 In -cer verbs, the c becomes a ç before endings that start with a or o, to indicate that it is still pronounced /s/ (je déplace - nous déplaçons); similarly, in -ger verbs, the g becomes ge before such endings, to indicate that it is pronounced /ʒ/ (je mange - nous mangeons).
 In -oyer and -uyer verbs, the y becomes an i before endings that start with a silent e (nous envoyons - j'envoie); in -ayer verbs, the writer may or may not change the y to an i before such endings (je paye - je paie). Additionally, the future and conditional forms of envoyer start with enverr- rather than envoyer-; and similarly with renvoyer.
 In -é.er verbs, the é becomes an è before silent endings, and optionally in the future and conditional tenses.
 In -e.er verbs other than most -eler and -eter verbs, the e becomes an è before endings that start with a silent e (including the future and conditional endings). For example: peler (to peel) -> je pèle (present) / je pèlerai (futur) / je pèlerais (conditional).
 In most -eler and -eter verbs, the writer must either change the e to an è before endings that start with a silent e, or change the l or t to ll or tt. In the rest of these verbs, only one or the other form is allowed. For example: appeler (to call) -> j'appelle (present) / j'appellerai (futur) / j'appellerais (conditional).
The verbal adjective of following verbs is irregular: adhérer - adhérent(e)(s); coïncider - coïncident(e)(s); confluer - confluent(e)(s); affluer - affluent(e)(s); converger - convergent(e)(s); déterger - détergent(e)(s); différer - différent(e)(s); exceller - excellent(e)(s); diverger - divergent(e)(s); négliger - négligent(e)(s); précéder - précédent(e)(s); violer - violent(e)(s); influer - influent(e)(s); communiquer - communicant(e)(s); suffoquer - suffocant(e)(s); provoquer -  provocant(e)(s); naviguer - navigant(e)(s); déléguer - délégant(e)(s); fatiguer - fatigant(e)(s); intriguer - intrigant(e)(s).

Second-group verbs (-ir verbs / gerund ending in -issant)
The -ir verbs differ from the -er verbs in the following points:
 The vowel of the inflections is always -i-, for example -isse in the past subjunctive rather than the -asse of the -er verbs.
 A few of the singular inflections themselves change, though this is purely orthographic and does not affect the pronunciation: in the simple present and past, these are -s, -s, -t rather than -Ø, -s, -Ø. (The change in pronunciation is due to the change of vowel from e, ai, a to -i-.)
 In the simple present, imperfect, the present subjunctive, and the gerund, a suffix -iss-  appears between the root and the inflectional endings. In the simple present singular, this suffix has disappeared and the endings are -is, -is, -it.

choisir

Non-finite forms:
 Infinitive: choisir 
 Present participle: choisissant 
 Gerundive: en choisissant 
 Verbal adjective: choisissant(s) , choisissante(s) 
 Past participle: choisi(e)(s) 

Auxiliary verb: avoir (partir uses être)

Third group

Most verbs of the third group end in -re. A few end in -ir and three end in -er. There are more irregularities in the third group than in the first two.

There is no single pattern that is followed by third group verbs, but rather a number of different paradigms. The verb perdre and its endings are frequently presented as an example for the third group conjugations. See the irregular verb section for more details.

perdre

Non-finite forms:
 Infinitive: perdre 
 Present participle: perdant 
 Gerundive: en perdant 
 Verbal adjective: perdant(s) , perdante(s) 
 Past participle: perd-u(e)(s) 

Auxiliary verb: avoir

Irregular verbs and their paradigms

First sub-conjugation: Verbs with seven principal parts
Most irregular French verbs can be described with seven principal parts.  In reality, few if any verbs have separate stems for all seven parts; instead, they tend to "inherit" the same stem as another part.  Note that the endings for these verbs are basically the same as for regular -ir verbs; in fact, regular -ir verbs can be fit into this scheme by treating the -iss- variants as different principal parts.

The following table shows how the paradigm of an irregular verb is constructed from its principal parts.  Note that a few verbs construct the present indicative (especially the singular) differently.

1 The -t is regularly dropped when directly following a d or t (e.g. il vend "he sells", not *il vendt).

Non-finite forms:
 Infinitive: (full infinitive, with suffix)
 Present participle: 1P-ant
 Gerundive: en 1P-ant
 Verbal adjective: 1P-ant(e)(s)
 Past participle: PP(e)(s)

The following table gives principal parts for a number of irregular verbs.  There are a number of fair-sized groups of verbs that are conjugated alike; these are listed first.  There are some additional irregularities in the present indicative, which are listed below.  Nearly all irregularities affect the singular, and are purely issues of spelling. (Stems that are irregular in the sense of being unpredictable by the above rules are given in boldface.)

1 Only in Quebec French

2 The ending -t is regularly dropped when directly following a d or t (e.g. il vend "he sells", not *il vendt).

3 Alternation of "-ai-" and  -oi- before consonant or unstressed e, "-ay-" and -oy- before other vowels is automatic in all verbs.

The following table shows an example paradigm of one of these verbs, recevoir "to receive".

Non-finite forms:
 Infinitive: recevoir
 Present participle: recevant
 Gerundive: en recevant
 Verbal adjective: recevant(e)(s)
 Past participle: reçu(e)(s)

Verbs with eleven principal parts

Nine verbs also have an irregular subjunctive stem, used at least for the singular and third plural of the present subjunctive.  These verbs can be said to have 11 principal parts, because the subjunctive stem may or may not be used for the first and second plural present subjunctive, the imperative and/or the present participle, in ways that vary from verb to verb.

The following table shows how the paradigm of an 11-principal-part irregular verb is constructed from its principal parts.  Note that these verbs are generally the most irregular verbs in French, and many of them construct the present indicative (especially the singular) in an idiosyncratic fashion.  The verb aller also constructs its past participle and simple past differently, according to the endings for -er verbs.

Non-finite forms:
 Infinitive: (full infinitive, with suffix)
 Present participle: 1P-ant or SUBJ-ant
 Gerundive: en 1P-ant or en SUBJ-ant
 Verbal adjective: 1P-ant(e)(s) or SUBJ-ant(e)(s)
 Past participle: PP(e)(s)

The following table gives the principal parts for the 11-principal-part verbs. (Stems that are irregular in the sense of being unpredictable by the above rules are given in boldface.)

Aller
The verb aller means "to go" and is sufficiently irregular that it merits listing its conjugation in full.  It is the only verb with the first group ending "er" to have an irregular conjugation. It belongs to none of the three sections of the third group, and is often categorized on its own.
The verb has different stems for different tenses. These are all pronounced differently: past all-  (simple past, imperfect, past subjunctive);  present subjunctive aill- ; conditional and future ir- . The inflections of these tenses are completely regular, and pronounced as in any other -er verb. However, in the simple present, not only are there stem changes, but the inflections are irregular as well:

The non-finite forms are all based on all- :
 Infinitive: aller
 Present participle: allant
 Gerundive: en allant
 Verbal adjective: allant(e)(s)
 Past participle: allé(e)(s)

Auxiliary verb: être

1 In Classical French and even in certain dialects (like in Cajun and some Quebec dialects) je vas is used.

Inflectional endings of the three verb groups

1. In an interrogative sentence, the final e is written é (traditional spelling) or è (rectified spelling), and is pronounced as an open è . Additionally, the e in je becomes silent. For example: je marche  (I walk), marchè-je?  (do I walk?)

2. Only in je/tu peux (I/you can), je/tu veux (I/you want), and je/tu vaux (I am/you are 'worth').

. Verbs in -dre have a final d for the 3rd singular person, except for those ending in -indre and -soudre which take a final t. The verbs vaincre (defeat) and convaincre (convince) are conjugated as vainc and convainc, respectively, in 3rd singular person.

3. The only verbs having this ending are: assaillir (assail), couvrir (cover), cueillir (pluck), défaillir (default), offrir (offer), ouvrir (open), souffrir (suffer), tressaillir (shiver), and in the imperative only, avoir (have), savoir (know), and vouloir (want).

4. Except for je vins (I came), je tins (I held), etc..., que je vinsse (that I come), que je tinsse (that I hold), etc...

See also
Bescherelle, a reference book for (usually French) verb conjugation

Notes

References

Larousse de la conjugaison, 1980.

External links
Verb2Verbe - French/English verb conjugation with translations
Language Atlas - overview of all the different types of conjugations and corresponding Anki files
A two-page PDF reference guide of the 681 most common French/English verbs
Le Conjugueur - online conjugation for all French verbs
Bescherelle - conjugation & conjugation books.
WordReference - French conjugation (Beta)
Conjugation-FR - French conjugation
Open source XML database of French verb conjugation rules. RegEx based.
French verb practice at UT Austin
schoLINGUA - Conjugation trainer - over 12,000 French verbs
Comment-conjuguer.fr - online conjugation for all French verbs and conjugation rules

Conjugations
Indo-European verbs